Diocese of Melbourne or Archdiocese of Melbourne could refer to:
Anglican Diocese of Melbourne
Roman Catholic Archdiocese of Melbourne